The .240 Weatherby Magnum was developed in 1968 by Roy Weatherby. In the development of his own .240in/6 mm cartridge, Weatherby was significantly influenced by both the success and the limitations of the .244 H&H Magnum cartridge devised in England by his friend and colleague David Lloyd. It was the last cartridge to be designed by Roy Weatherby.

Design
The .240 Weatherby Mag. is a proprietary cartridge used only in Weatherby rifles. This particular Weatherby case is unique: other than shape, it isn't physically based on other Weatherby cases, having the same rim diameter and a similar length to the .30-06. It utilizes the traditional Weatherby rounded double shoulder and a belted case with a length of 2.496in, significantly shorter than the 2.8in case of the .244 H&H Mag.

Performance
In terms of velocity, the .240 Weatherby Magnum was once the fastest commercially produced 6 mm cartridge. There were several faster wildcat rounds available, but the .240 Wby. However, the lightweight .243 WSSM 55gr Ballistic Silvertip now outpaces Weatherby's offerings according to some.
Loading data from Western Powders puts the .240 Wby.

While favoured by some varmint hunters, the .240 Wby. Mag. is not much liked by some reloaders because the case cannot be formed out of any other brass; one either has to buy Weatherby ammunition or reload used Weatherby cases which tend to be more expensive than those for more common cartridges. With heavier bullets the .240 Wby. Mag. makes for a good deer hunting cartridge, but it does tend to require a long (>.) barrel in order to achieve peak performance.

See also
 List of rifle cartridges
 Table of handgun and rifle cartridges

References

 Cartridge Dimensions at Steves Pages
 mm)/240%20Weatherby%20Magnum%20page%20209.pdf .240 Wby data at Accurate Powder

External links
 Weatherby Web Site

Weatherby Magnum rifle cartridges
Pistol and rifle cartridges
Magnum rifle cartridges